Ramón Balcells Comas (born 6 August 1951 in Barcelona) is a sailor from Spain.

Balcells represented his country at the 1972 Summer Olympics in Kiel. Balcells took 9th place in the Soling with his father Ramón Balcells Rodón as helmsman and Juan Llort as fellow crew member.

References

Living people
1951 births
Olympic sailors of Spain
People from Barcelona
Real Club Marítimo de Barcelona sailors
Sailors at the 1972 Summer Olympics – Soling
Spanish male sailors (sport)